Tihuța Pass (also called Pasul Bârgău;  or Burgó) is a high mountain pass in the Romanian Bârgău Mountains (Eastern Carpathian Mountains) connecting Bistrița (Transylvania) with Vatra Dornei (Bukovina, Moldavia).

The pass was made famous by Bram Stoker's novel Dracula, where, termed as "the Borgo Pass", it was the gateway to the realm of Count Dracula. Stoker most likely found the name on a contemporary map; he never actually visited the area.

The hotel has become quite an attraction due to its architectural style of a medieval villa, as well as the connection to the novel. In 2018 the property was put up for sale.

See also 
 List of highest paved roads in Europe
 List of mountain passes

References 

Mountain passes of Romania
Mountain passes of the Carpathians